Domenica (also known as Sunday) is a 2001 Italian drama film directed by Wilma Labate. It entered the "Panorama" section at the 51st Berlin International Film Festival.

Plot 
Naples. Inspector Sciarra, afflicted by an incurable disease and on the eve of retirement, has the task of accompanying Domenica - a 12-year-old orphan - to the morgue to recognize the body of her rapist. His rapist, in fact, commits suicide in the police by jumping out of the window, and this recognition would help the police to avoid problems. It is the commissioner himself who asks Inspector Sciarra to track down the girl, who lives by tricks and wandering around the city. After several attempts, Inspector Sciarra spends an afternoon with Domenica at, at the end of the day. both will realize that they have been used and that a deep emotional bond has been established between them.

Cast 

 Domenica Giuliano as Domenica 
Claudio Amendola as  Inspector Sciarra 
Annabella Sciorra as  Betibù 
Valerio Binasco as  Porcaro 
 Peppe Servillo as  Police commissioner 
Rosalinda Celentano as   Suora

See also
 List of Italian films of 2001

References

External links

2000s coming-of-age drama films
2001 films
Italian coming-of-age drama films
Films directed by Wilma Labate
2001 drama films
2000s Italian films